Hester Maria Peirce is an American lawyer who serves as a Commissioner on the Securities and Exchange Commission (SEC). She previously served as the director of the Financial Markets Working Group at George Mason University's Mercatus Center. Peirce was confirmed by the United States Senate in December 2017 to fill a Republican vacancy on the SEC. She was sworn in on January 11, 2018, for a term ending in 2020, and her second term expires in 2025. Peirce is a former staff member of the United States Senate Committee on Banking, Housing, and Urban Affairs and of the SEC. In 2016, she was nominated by President Barack Obama for Commissioner on the SEC, but the United States Senate did not act on her nomination.

Education
Peirce earned her B.A. in economics from Case Western Reserve University (1993) and her J.D. from Yale Law School (1997).

Career

Legal career
Peirce started her career as a clerk for Judge Roger Andewelt on the Court of Federal Claims from 1997–1998. Afterwards, she was an associate at Washington, D.C. law firm Wilmer, Cutler & Pickering (today WilmerHale) between 1998 and 2000.
In 2000, Peirce served at the Securities and Exchange Commission, first as a staff attorney in the Division of Investment Management from 2000 to 2004 and then as counsel to Commissioner Paul S. Atkins from 2004 to 2008.

Afterwards, Peirce worked as part of Senator Richard Shelby's staff on the Senate Committee on Banking, Housing, and Urban Affairs. In that position, Peirce's work mostly centered on the financial regulatory reform in the aftermath of the financial crisis of 2008 and the oversight of the regulatory implementation of the Dodd–Frank Act.

Between 2012 and 2017, Peirce was a senior research fellow and the director of the Financial Markets Working Group at the Mercatus Center at George Mason University where she also teaches as an adjunct professor at the Antonin Scalia Law School. Peirce is a member of the Federalist Society.

U.S. Securities and Exchange Commission
In 2015, Peirce was chosen during the Obama administration to fill a Republican seat at the U.S. Securities and Exchange Commission. Democrats on the Senate Banking Committee attempted to block her nomination because she declined to fully commit to requiring corporations to publicly disclose political donations. Peirce was eventually approved by the Senate Banking Committee, but the full Senate never voted on her nomination. 

On July 18, 2017, the White House announced that President Donald Trump would nominate Peirce as a Commissioner of the SEC for the remainder of a five-year term expiring on June 5, 2020. She was confirmed by the U.S. Senate on December 21, 2017, and sworn in on January 11, 2018. on August 6, 2020, the Senate confirmed Peirce by voice vote for another five-year term expiring on June 5, 2025, and was sworn in on August 17, 2020.

Views
Peirce regularly contributed through books, articles, comments and statements to the debate about banking regulation. She has been critical of the regulatory expansion enacted in response to the 2008 financial crisis. In her 2012 book Dodd-Frank, What It Does and Why It's Flawed, she argues for economic freedom and against the idea that markets could be improved through regulatory micromanagement. She stated that the more important regulation becomes, the less are banks oriented towards their actual duty, which is to service customers with financial opportunities. In 2016, a book she co-edited entitled Reframing Financial Regulation: Enhancing Stability and Protecting Consumers was published by the Mercatus Center.

Peirce had opinion editorials published in The New York Times in 2012 and in 2013, wherein she said it would be more sensible to let the market pare the big banks down to size rather than nationalizing them. Peirce has also authored articles in American Banker, The Hill and FinRegRag. In January 2017, she spoke at the American Economic Association in Chicago, where she discussed reforms of the role of financial regulators a topic she had previously raised in a video by the Mercatus Center in 2015.

In 2018, Peirce argued that lawyers who work for large corporations practice a form of public interest law. She also suggested that her own work at the SEC "indirectly" qualified as public interest law.

On May 25, 2022, Peirce stated that the United States had "dropped the regulatory ball" with respect to cryptocurrency regulation.

In June 2022, Peirce argued in her capacity as a Commissioner at the U.S. Securities and Exchange Commission that "it is time for the Commission to stop denying categorically spot crypto exchange-traded products."

References

Year of birth missing (living people)
Living people
American women lawyers
Members of the U.S. Securities and Exchange Commission
George Mason University alumni
Case Western Reserve University alumni
Yale Law School alumni
Federalist Society members
American economics writers
Trump administration personnel
Wilmer Cutler Pickering Hale and Dorr associates
Virginia Republicans
21st-century American women